- is the ASCII and Unicode hyphen-minus character U+002D.

- may also refer to:

 hyphen,  (U+2010)
 minus sign,  (U+2212)
 dash,  (U+2012)
 en dash,  (U+2013)
 em dash,  (U+2014)
 quotation dash (horizontal bar),  (U+2015)
 - (album), pronounced "subtract", a 2023 album by Ed Sheeran

See also 
 -- (disambiguation)
 Chinese radical 1